Argyrotaenia lignea is a species of moth of the family Tortricidae. It is found in Chimborazo Province, Ecuador.

References

Moths described in 1917
lignea
Moths of South America